Lisa Ann Richardson (born June 23, 1966 in Schenectady, New York, United States) is a Danish curler and curling coach.

Richardson is married to Danish curler and coach Ulrik Schmidt. She was raised in Cambridge, Ontario.

Teams

Women's

Mixed

Record as a coach of national teams

References

External links
 

Living people
1966 births
Sportspeople from Schenectady, New York
Danish female curlers
Curlers at the 2002 Winter Olympics
Olympic curlers of Denmark
European curling champions
Danish curling champions
Danish curling coaches
American emigrants to Denmark
Sportspeople from Cambridge, Ontario